Devouring Radiant Light is the sixth studio album by American extreme metal band Skeletonwitch. It was released in July 2018 by Prosthetic Records.

Track listing

Personnel
Skeletonwitch
Nate Garnette – lead guitar, backing vocals
Scott Hedrick – rhythm guitar
Evan Linger – bass
Adam Clemans – vocals
Dustin Boltjes – drums

Production
Kurt Ballou – recording, production
Fredrik Nordström – mixing
Brad Boatright – mastering

Artwork
Stéfan Thanneur – cover
Branca Studio – layout
Nico Paolillo – photography

Accolades

References

2018 albums
Skeletonwitch albums
Prosthetic Records albums